The eleventh series of the British medical drama television series Casualty commenced airing in the United Kingdom on BBC One on 14 September 1996 and finished on 22 February 1997. Notable events of the series include the death of Josh's wife and children as a result of a house fire, the birth of Charlie and Baz's son Louis, and the near-fatal stabbing of Jude at the end of the series.

Cast

Overview
The eleventh series of Casualty features a cast of characters working in the emergency department of Holby City Hospital. The series began with 8 roles with star billing. Clive Mantle starred as emergency medicine consultant Mike Barratt. Julia Watson appeared as specialist registrar Barbara "Baz" Hayes. Derek Thompson continued his role as charge nurse Charlie Fairhead while Sorcha Cusack portrayed ward sister Kate Wilson. Lisa Coleman appeared as staff nurse Jude Korcanik. Ian Bleasdale and Sue Devaney starred as paramedics Josh Griffiths and Liz Harker. Jason Merrells portrayed receptionist Matt Hawley. Soo Drouet guest starred throughout the series as Monica, an anaesthetist. 

Jonathan Kerrigan, Ganiat Kasumu and Gray O'Brien were introduced at the beginning of the series as staff nurses Sam Colloby and Gloira Hammond and senior house officer Richard McCaig. Clive Mantle returned to the cast in episode one as emergency medicine consultant Mike Barratt following his departure in the previous series. Mantle left the cast in episode ten and was replaced by Peter Birch in the following episode as emergency medicine consultant Jack Hathaway. Vas Blackwood was introduced as receptionist David Sinclair and left the show at the conclusion of the series. Donna Alexander appeared in episodes seventeen, twenty and twenty-one as paramedic Penny Hutchens, while Lucy Cohu appeared between episode eighteen and twenty-three as Jayne Bazeley, a love interest for Jack.

Main characters 
Peter Birch as Jack Hathaway (from episode 11)
Vas Blackwood as David Sinclair (episodes 21−24)
Ian Bleasdale as Josh Griffiths
Lisa Coleman as Jude Korcanik (until episode 24)
Sorcha Cusack as Kate Wilson
Sue Devaney as Liz Harker
Ganiat Kasumu as Gloira Hammond (episodes 1−24)
Jonathan Kerrigan as Sam Colloby (from episode 2)
Clive Mantle as Mike Barratt (episodes 1−10)
Jason Merrells as Matt Hawley (until episode 24)
Gray O'Brien as Richard McCaig (from episode 1)
Derek Thompson as Charlie Fairhead
Julia Watson as Barbara "Baz" Hayes (until episode 1, from episode 9)

Recurring and guest characters 
Donna Alexander as Penny Hutchens (episodes 17−21)
Lucy Cohu as Jayne Bazeley (episodes 18−23)
Soo Drouet as Monica (from episode 1)
Michael N. Harbour as Trevor Wilson (until episode 10)

Episodes

References

External links 
 Casualty series 11 at the Internet Movie Database 
 
 
 
 
11 
1996 British television seasons
1997 British television seasons